Paul Mazurkiewicz (born September 8, 1968) is an American drummer best known as a member for death metal band Cannibal Corpse. Mazurkiewicz was originally the drummer for the band, Tirant Sin, alongside two other future Cannibal Corpse members Chris Barnes and Bob Rusay. The trio joined Alex Webster and Jack Owen in 1988, forming Cannibal Corpse. He is also currently the drummer for assorted side projects including Umbilicus and Heaven's Gate. Besides drumming, he also plays the guitar, and is the group's primary lyricist and contributes heavily to composing songs; he penned the songs "Dead Human Collection", "Frantic Disembowelment", "Monolith", "Carrion Sculpted Entity", and "Worm Infested". Mazurkiewicz, along with Webster, is one of the remaining members of the band since its inception.

Personal life 

Mazurkiewicz divorced in 2019. He has one daughter. He became a vegetarian in 2002 and he lives with his family and animals on a farm-like property including a couple of acres of land. In 2022 Mazurkiewicz also took time to expand outside the death metal genre he's become renowned for and co-formed the side projects Umbilicus, a 1970s style hard rock group with Deicide guitarist Taylor Nordberg and also Heaven's Gate, a crossover thrash project also featuring Municipal Waste vocalist Tony Foresta.

Equipment
Mazurkiewicz uses and endorses ddrum drums, Zildjian cymbals, Czarcie Kopyto pedals and Regal Tip drumsticks. He previously used and endorsed Tama Drums.

Current tour kit
Drums – ddrum USA Standard Satin Red, Black Nickel Hardware
22x20 Bass Drum (x2)
10x9 Tom
12x10 Tom
14x11 Tom
16x16 Floor Tom
14x5 Vintone Nickel Over Brass Snare Drum
Cymbals – Zildjian
14" A Custom Hi-Hats
18" A Heavy Crash
17" A Heavy Crash
18" A Custom Projection Crash
21" A Mega Bell Ride
20" A Custom China
Hardware
Monolit Czarcie Kopyto Pedals (x2)
DW 9000 Hi-Hat Stand
Other
Regal Tip Speed-Ex Drumsticks

References

External links
Cannibal Corpse tribute site
Paul's MySpace
www.cannibalcorpse.net 
facebook @PaulMazurkiewicz

1968 births
20th-century American drummers
American heavy metal drummers
American male drummers
American people of Polish descent
Cannibal Corpse members
Death metal musicians
Jewish American musicians
Jewish heavy metal musicians
Living people
Place of birth missing (living people)